Events in the year 1673 in Norway.

Incumbents
Monarch: Christian V

Events

Arts and literature

Austre Moland Church was built.
Leinstrand Church was built.

Births

Povel Juel, civil servant and writer (d. 1723).
Gertrud Rask, missionary (d 1735).

Deaths

See also

References